13 Frightened Girls (also known as The Candy Web) is a 1963 Pathécolor Cold War spy film directed and produced by William Castle. Kathy Dunn stars as a teenage sleuth who finds herself embroiled in international espionage.

Castle, who was famous for promoting his films with gimmicks, generated publicity by advertising for girls from 13 countries to compete for parts as daughters of diplomats. However, not all of the 15 actresses were from the countries that they represented in the film; for example, American Judy Pace played a Liberian.

Plot
After a 16-year-old girl Candy Hull develops a crush on intelligence agent Wally Sanders in London, she helps him to uncover a communist plot against the United States.

Cast

 Murray Hamilton as Wally Sanders
 Kathy Dunn as Candace "Candy" Hull
 Joyce Taylor as Soldier
 Hugh Marlowe as John Hull
 Khigh Dhiegh as Kang
 Charlie Briggs as Mike
 Norma Varden as Miss Pittford
 Garth Benton as Peter Van Hagen
 Emil Sitka as Ludwig (uncredited)

The other diplomats' daughters:

 María Cristina Servera (Argentina)
 Janet Mary Prance (Australia)
 Penny Anne Mills (Canada)
 Alexandra Bastedo as Alex (United Kingdom) as Alexandra Lendon Bastedo
 Ariane Glaser (France)
 Ilona Schütze as Ilona (Germany)
 Anna Baj (Italy)
 Aiko Sakamoto (Japan)
 Gina Trikonis as Natasha (Russia)
 Judy Pace (Liberia)
 Luz Gloria Hervias (Mexico)
 Marie-Louise Bielke (Sweden)
 Ignacia Farias Luque (Venezuela)
 Lynne Sue Moon as Mai-Ling (China)

Reception
In a brief contemporary review for The New York Times, critic Louis Calta wrote: "The young Mata Hari is vigorously played by pretty Kathy Dunn, who was one of the Trapp children in The Sound of Music. If only young Kathy could have raised her voice in song instead of playing detective, things might have been different at the United States Embassy."  Calta was referring to the stage version of The Sound of Music, not the film; Dunn was not in the film version, which was released two years later.

Home media
The film was released on DVD in 2009 as part of the William Castle Film Collection. Sony also released a DVD of the film by itself. The film was released on Blu-ray in 2016 by Mill Creek Entertainment as part of a double-feature disc with the 1960 Castle film 13 Ghosts.

See also
 List of American films of 1963

References

External links

 
 
 
 

1963 films
1960s spy thriller films
American comedy thriller films
Teen mystery films
Cold War spy films
Films set in London
Films set in Switzerland
Columbia Pictures films
Films directed by William Castle
American spy thriller films
1960s female buddy films
1960s teen films
1960s English-language films
1960s American films